Teliana Santos Pereira (born 20 July 1988) is a Brazilian former professional tennis player.

On 19 April 2015, she became the first Brazilian in 27 years to win a title on the WTA Tour, beating Yaroslava Shvedova in Bogotá 7–6, 6–1. She achieved a singles ranking of world No. 48 in August 2015, after having won her second WTA title at Florianópolis by defeating German Annika Beck in three sets.

On 19 October 2015, she reached her best singles ranking of world No. 43. Pereira won 22 singles and ten doubles titles on the ITF Circuit.

Playing for Brazil Fed Cup team, she has a win–loss record of 26–11 in international competition.

Early and personal life
Teliana Pereira was born on 20 July 1988 in Águas Belas, and was coached by her brother, Renato. Pereira's parents are Jose, who worked at a sugar cane plantation, and Maria; she has three brothers and three sisters. At a very young age, her father moved to Curitiba, where he had two brothers, and once he got a job at a tennis academy, he arranged for the rest of the family to follow him. Everyone got work at the academy as well, with Teliana being a ball girl. Given the academy owner, Frenchman Didier Rayon, brought the Pereira children to the court whenever a student did not show up, Pereira started playing at age 8, and said that she already had grown an interest watching Renato play. One year later, she entered a tournament and won, making Rayon decide to become her coach.  Pereira's favorite tournament is the French Open. Her childhood tennis idol was Gustavo Kuerten. Her favourite surface is clay.

Career
In February 2013, Pereira reached the semifinals of Copa Colsanitas as a qualifier, which boosted her singles ranking to 116.

In February 2014, she reached the semifinals of the Rio Open.

In April 2015, Pereira reached the final of Copa Colsanitas, where she won her first WTA title beating fifth seed Yaroslava Shvedova, in straight sets to become the first Brazilian woman to win a WTA singles title since 1988, and jumping 130 places up the WTA rankings to No. 81.

In July 2015, she won her second WTA Tour title at the Brasil Tennis Cup in Florianópolis. With the result, Pereira entered the top 50 for the first time. She was just the second Brazilian in the Open era to win a WTA title in Brazil – Niege Dias achieved the feat once, doing it over in Guarujá in 1987.

Pereira performed very poorly throughout 2016 and finally dropped out of top 200 by the end of the season.

In September 2020, Pereira announced her retirement at the age of 32, declaring she had lost interest in training and travels, while expressing satisfaction with how her career went, with two WTA titles and "always surpassing my expectations".

Grand Slam performance timelines

Singles

WTA career finals

Singles: 2 (2 titles)

WTA Challenger finals

Doubles: 1 (runner-up)

ITF Circuit finals

Singles: 31 (22 titles, 9 runner–ups)

Doubles: 22 (10 titles, 12 runner–ups)

Record against players who were ranked top 10
Ranked top 10 at some point in their career (but not necessarily when they faced Pereira)

Notes

References

External links
 
 
 

1988 births
Living people
Sportspeople from Alagoas
Brazilian female tennis players
Tennis players at the 2007 Pan American Games
Tennis players at the 2011 Pan American Games
Pan American Games bronze medalists for Brazil
Olympic tennis players of Brazil
Tennis players at the 2016 Summer Olympics
Pan American Games medalists in tennis
South American Games medalists in tennis
South American Games gold medalists for Brazil
Competitors at the 2006 South American Games
Medalists at the 2007 Pan American Games